is a Japanese athlete specialising in the sprint hurdles. She won a bronze medal at the 2019 Asian Championships.

Her personal bests are 13.17 seconds in the 100 metres hurdles (+1.1 m/s, Yamaguchi 2018) and 8.18 seconds in the 60 metres hurdles (Osaka 2019).

International competitions

References

1994 births
Living people
Sportspeople from Okayama
Japanese female hurdlers
Asian Games bronze medalists for Japan
Asian Games medalists in athletics (track and field)
Athletes (track and field) at the 2014 Asian Games
Athletes (track and field) at the 2018 Asian Games
Medalists at the 2014 Asian Games
Japan Championships in Athletics winners
Athletes (track and field) at the 2020 Summer Olympics
Olympic athletes of Japan
20th-century Japanese women
21st-century Japanese women